Robert Miller Hazen (born November 1, 1948) is an American mineralogist and astrobiologist. He is a research scientist at the Carnegie Institution of Washington's Geophysical Laboratory and Clarence Robinson Professor of Earth Science at George Mason University, in the United States. Hazen is the Executive Director of the Deep Carbon Observatory.

Early life
Hazen was born in Rockville Centre, New York, on November 1, 1948. His parents were Peggy Hazen (née Dorothy Ellen Chapin; 1918–2002) and Dan Hazen (né Daniel Francis Hazen, Jr.; 1918–2016). He spent his early childhood in Cleveland, near a fossil quarry where he collected his first trilobite at the age of about 9.

The Hazen family moved to New Jersey, where Robert's eight-grade teacher, Bill Welsh, observed Robert's interest in his collection of minerals. Hazen later recalled "He gave me a starter collection of 100 specimens, mineral field guides, and mimeographed directions to Paterson and Franklin, New Jersey." Hazen also had an early interest in music, starting with the piano at age 5, the violin at 6 and the trumpet at age 9.

Education 
Hazen worked on his B.S. and S.M. (Master of Science) in Earth Science at the Massachusetts Institute of Technology 1971. He started with the intention of going into chemical engineering, but he was captivated by the enthusiasm of David Wones and converted to mineralogy. With Wones as advisor, he completed a masters thesis on cation substitution in trioctahedral micas; his publication in American Mineralogist was his first to be highly cited. He completed a Ph.D. in Mineralogy & Crystallography at Harvard University in 1975. His thesis, with Charles Burnham as advisor, involved learning how to use a 4-circle diffractometer to do high-pressure X-ray crystallography and applying it to olivine. This became a focus of his early career.

While a NATO Postdoctoral Fellow at Cambridge University in England, Hazen worked with Charles Prewitt to determine empirical relations for the effect of temperature and pressure on interatomic distances in oxides and silicates.

Geophysical Laboratory
In 1976, Hazen joined the Carnegie Institution's Geophysical Laboratory as a research associate. After a brief stint measuring optical properties of lunar minerals with Peter Bell and David Mao, he started to do X-ray crystallography with Larry Finger. He later recalled, "It was a match made in mineralogical heaven: Larry loved to write code, build machines, and analyze data; I loved to mount crystals, run the diffractometers, and write papers." They collaborated for two decades and determined about a thousand crystal structures at variable pressures and temperatures, work summarized in their 1982 book Comparative Crystal Chemistry.

Much of the work that Hazen was doing could be classified as mineral physics, a cross between geophysics and mineralogy. Although the field had pioneering contributions from the Nobel Prize winner Percy Bridgman and a student of his, Francis Birch, in the early- to mid-20th century, it did not have a name until the 1960s, and in the 1970s some scientists were concerned that a more interdisciplinary approach was needed to understand the relationship between interatomic forces and mineral properties. Hazen and Prewitt co-convened the first mineral physics conference; it was held on October 17–19, 1977 at the Airlie House in Warrenton, Virginia.

High-temperature superconductors

Cooled to very low temperatures, some materials experience a sudden transition where electrical resistance drops to zero and any magnetic fields are expelled. This phenomenon is called superconductivity. Superconductors have a host of applications including powerful electromagnets, fast digital circuits and sensitive magnetometers, but the very low temperatures needed make the applications more difficult and expensive. Until the 1980s, no superconductors existed above . This set off a frenzied search for higher critical temperatures.

A group led by Paul Chu at the University of Houston explored some materials made of yttrium, barium, copper and oxygen (YCBO) and were the first to obtain a critical temperature above the boiling point of liquid nitrogen. The YCBO samples had a mixture of black and green minerals, and although the researchers knew the average composition, they did not know the compositions of the two phases. In February 1987, Chu turned to Mao and Hazen, because they could determine the composition of small mineral grains in rocks. It took Mao and Hazen a week to determine the compositions; the black phase, which turned out to be the superconductor, was YBa2Cu3O7−δ.

Mao and Hazen determined that the crystal structure of the superconducting phase was like that of perovskite, an important mineral in Earth's mantle. Subsequently, Hazen's group identified twelve more high-temperature oxide superconductors, all with perovskite structures, and worked on organic superconductors.

Origins of life

By the mid-1990s, Hazen felt that his research had reached a "respectable plateau" where the main principles of how crystals compress were known. The questions he was asking were increasingly narrow and the answers rarely surprising. So he changed research directions to study life's chemical origins. This opportunity came when a colleague at George Mason University, Harold Morowitz, realized that the temperature and pressure at a hydrothermal vent might change the properties of water, allowing chemical reactions that ordinarily require the help of an enzyme. Enlisting the help of Hatten Yoder, a specialist in high pressure mineralogy, they tried subjecting pyruvate in water to high pressure, hoping for a simple reaction that would return oxaloacetate. Instead, an analysis by an organic geochemist, George Cody, found that they obtained tens of thousands of molecules.

The publication of their results, which seemed to support the deep sea vent hypothesis, met with heavy criticism, especially from Stanley Miller and colleagues who believe that life emerged on the surface. Along with the general criticism that organic compounds would not survive long in hot, high pressure conditions, they pointed out several flaws in the experiment. In his book, Genesis, Hazen acknowledges that Stanley Miller "was basically right" about the experiments, but argues that "the art of science isn't necessarily to avoid mistakes; rather, progress is often made by making mistakes as fast as possible, while avoiding making the same mistake twice." In subsequent work, the group formed biomolecules from carbon dioxide and water and catalyzed the formation of amino acids using oxides and sulfides of transition metals; and different transition elements catalyze different organic reactions.

Homochirality

Organic molecules often come in two mirror-image forms, often referred to as "right-handed" and "left-handed". This handedness is called chirality. For example, the amino acid alanine comes in a right-handed (D-alanine) and a left-handed (L-alanine) form. Living cells are very selective, choosing amino acids only in the left-handed form and sugars in the right-handed form. However, most abiotic processes produce an equal amount of each. Somehow life must have developed this preference (homochirality); but while scientists have proposed several theories, they have no consensus on the mechanism.

Hazen investigated the possibility that organic molecules might acquire a chiral asymmetry when grown on the faces of mineral crystals. Some, like quartz, come in mirror-image forms; others, like calcite, are symmetric about their centers but their faces come in pairs with opposite chirality. With Tim Filley, an expert at organic chemical analysis, and Glenn Goodfriend, a geochemist, Hazen cleaned large calcite crystals and dipped them into aspartic acid. They found that each face of the crystal had a small preference for either left- or right-handed forms of aspartate. They proposed that a similar mechanism might work on other amino acids and sugars. This work attracted a lot of interest from the pharmaceutical industry, which needs to produce some of their drugs with a pure chirality.

Mineral evolution

At a Christmas party in 2006, the biophysicist Harold Morowitz asked Hazen whether there were clay minerals during the Archean Eon. Hazen could not recall a mineralogist ever having asked whether a given mineral existed in a given era, and it occurred to him that no one had ever explored how Earth's mineralogy changed over time. He worked on this question for a year with his closest colleague, geochemist Dimitri Sverjensky at Johns Hopkins University, and some other collaborators including a mineralogist, Robert Downs; a petrologist, John Ferry; and a geobiologist, Dominic Papineau. The result was a paper in American Mineralogist that provided a new historical context to mineralogy that they called mineral evolution.

Based on a review of the literature, Hazen and his co-authors estimated that the number of minerals in the Solar System has grown from about a dozen at the time of its formation to over 4300 at present. (As of 2017, the latter number has grown to 5300.). They predicted that there was a systematic increase in the number of mineral species over time, and identified three main eras of change: the formation of the Solar System and planets; the reworking of crust and mantle and the onset of plate tectonics; and the appearance of life. After the first era, there were 250 minerals; after the second, 1500. The remainder were made possible by the action of living organisms, particularly the addition of oxygen to the atmosphere. This paper was followed over the next few years by several studies concentrating on one chemical element at a time and mapping out the first appearances of minerals involving each element.

Deep Carbon Observatory
Hazen and his colleagues started the Carbon Mineral Challenge, a citizen science project dedicated to accelerating the discovery of "missing" carbon-bearing minerals.

Teaching
As the Clarence B. Robinson Professor at George Mason University, Hazen developed innovative courses to promote scientific literacy in both scientists and non-scientists. With physicist James Trefil, he developed a course that they described as "science appreciation", aimed at non-scientists. It was organized around a total of 20 "Great Ideas of Science" that were later reduced to 18. In addition to writing about their ideas in several magazines, they turned the course into a book, Science Matters: Achieving Scientific Literacy. They used the principles to organize explanations of a "vast number of socially significant, fundamental, or environmentally crucial topics." This was published with an amount of advance publicity that was unusual for a popular science book, including an article they wrote for the New York Times Sunday Magazine, praise from prolific author Isaac Asimov and physics Nobelist Leon Lederman, and a publicity tour. For an article in Science about the book, they provided the author with the original list of 20 ideas and invited readers to send in their comments. About 200 readers responded, generally supporting the idea of such a list while vehemently criticizing many of the particulars, including an informal style and sometimes vague language. Particularly criticized were numbers 1 ("The universe is regular and predictable") and 16 ("Everything on the earth operates in cycles"). Hazen and Trefil argued, in defense of point 1, that it was not intended as a defense of determinism and that they covered unpredictable phenomena like chaos; but they also used the responses to modify the list of ideas in subsequent editions.

Hazen and Trefil went on to write three undergraduate textbooks: The Sciences: An Integrated Approach (1993), The Physical Sciences: An Integrated Approach (1995), and Physics Matters: An Introduction to Conceptual Physics (2004). Hazen used these as the basis for a 60-lecture video and audio course called The Joy of Science.

Public engagement
In 2008, Hazen was an outgoing member of the AAAS Committee on Public Understanding of Science and Technology. He and his wife Margee, noting that it is important for scientists to engage with the public but actually doing so does not help them get tenure, proposed a new award, The Early Career Award for Public Engagement with Science, and established a fund for it. The first award, with a monetary prize of $5,000, was announced in 2010.

Honors
Hazen is a Fellow of the American Association for the Advancement of Science.

The Mineralogical Society of America presented Hazen with the Mineralogical Society of America Award in 1982 and the Distinguished Public Service Medal in 2009. In 2016, he received its highest award, the Roebling Medal. He also served as Distinguished Lecturer and is a Past President of the Society. A mineral that was discovered in Mono Lake was named hazenite in his honor by Hexiong Yang, a former student of his.

In 1986, Hazen received the Ipatieff Prize, which the American Chemical Society awards in recognition of "outstanding chemical experimental work in the field of catalysis or high pressure".

For the book The Music Men, he and his wife Margaret received the Deems Taylor Award from the American Society of Composers, Authors and Publishers in 1989.

For his popular and educational science writing, Hazen received the E.A. Wood Science Writing Award from the American Crystallographic Association in 1998,

In 2012, the State Council of Higher Education for Virginia presented Hazen with its Outstanding Faculty Award.

Hazen has presented numerous named lectures at universities. He gave a Directorate for Biological Sciences Distinguished Lecture at the National Science Foundation in 2007, and was named the Sigma Xi Distinguished Lecturer for 2008–2010.

In 2019, Hazen was named a Fellow of the American Geophysical Union.

In 2021,  Hazen was awarded the Medal of Excellence in Mineralogical Sciences from the International Mineralogical Association.

Publications
Hazen is author of more than 350 articles and 20 books on science, history, and music.

Refereed articles
Hazen has 289 refereed publications that have been cited a total of over 11,000 times, for an h-index of 58. A selection of articles follows:

Books

Family 
Hazen's wife, Margee (née Margaret Joan Hindle), is a science writer and published historian. Her late father, Howard Brooke Hindle, PhD (1918–2001), was a historian who studied the role of material culture in the history of the United States and served as Director of the National Museum of American History from 1974 to 1978.  Hazen's late brother, Dan Chapin Hazen, PhD (1947–2015), was an academic research librarian who had been affiliated with the libraries at Harvard, and was particularly recognized for his accomplishments to the Center for Research Libraries and advocacy of collections from Latin America.  Harvard has memorialized Dan Hazen by establishing two chairs in his name.
The Hazens have two children: Benjamin Hindle Hazen (born 1976) and Elizabeth Brooke Hazen (born 1978).

References

Further reading

External links
 
 Minerals and the Origins of Life (Robert Hazen, NASA) (video, 60m, April 2014).
 The Joy of Science (video course) (2001); Guide Book (PDF)
 Mineral Informatics: Visualizing the amazing mineral kingdom

1948 births
Living people
Harvard University alumni
George Mason University faculty
Fellows of the American Association for the Advancement of Science
American mineralogists
Massachusetts Institute of Technology School of Science alumni
Astrobiologists
American science writers
People from Rockville Centre, New York
Scientists from New York (state)
Foreign Members of the Russian Academy of Sciences
Fellows of the American Geophysical Union
Solid state chemists